Bangladesh National Film Award for Best Male Playback Singer is the highest award for male film playback singers in Bangladesh.

List of winners

Multiple wins
The following individuals have won multiple Best Director awards:

See also
 Bangladesh National Film Award for Best Female Playback Singer
 Bangladesh National Film Award for Best Music Director
 Bangladesh National Film Award for Best Music Composer
 Bangladesh National Film Award for Best Lyrics

Notes

References

Sources

External links

Playback Singer Male
 
Film music awards